The Little Nightingale (Spanish:El pequeño ruiseñor) is a 1956 Spanish musical film directed by Antonio del Amo.

It was the first film to star child singer Joselito. It skyrocketed him to fame. The film is the first of a trilogy dubbed «trilogía del ruiseñor». It was followed by Saeta del ruiseñor (1957) and El ruiseñor de las cumbres (1958). The success of the films allowed del Amo to set up his own production company Apolo Films with studios on the outskirts of Madrid.

Plot 
Joselito is a boy whose mother left town when he was just a newborn. He lives with the grandfather, the village bell ringer, and his best friend is the sacristan. A fan of singing, he has not given up hope of ever meeting his mother.

Cast 
 Joselito, the boy singer.
 Aníbal Vela, the priest.
 Mario Berritúa, Father Jesús.
 Lina Canalejas, Fuensanta.
 Mariano Azaña, Martín the sexton.
 Carmen Sánchez, Romualda.

References

Bibliography 
 D'Lugo, Marvin. Guide to the Cinema of Spain. Greenwood Publishing, 1997.

External links 
 

1956 films
Films set in Spain
1950s musical drama films
Spanish musical drama films
Films directed by Antonio del Amo
1956 drama films
1950s Spanish films
Spanish black-and-white films